Geofrey Nyeko (born 2 February 1959) is a Ugandan boxer. He competed at the 1980 Summer Olympics and the 1984 Summer Olympics. At the 1980 Summer Olympics, he lost to Richard Nowakowski of East Germany.

References

1959 births
Living people
Ugandan male boxers
Olympic boxers of Uganda
Boxers at the 1980 Summer Olympics
Boxers at the 1984 Summer Olympics
Place of birth missing (living people)
Lightweight boxers